David Cortes da Silva, or Davi (born 19 November 1963) is a Brazilian former footballer who played as a defender.

Club career
Davi played for Verdy Kawasaki in 1992. He played many matches at J.League Cup and the club won the champions.

National team career
In 1984, he was selected Brazil national team for 1984 Summer Olympics. At this tournament, Brazil won the silver medal.

Club statistics

References
Profile at mamvs.narod.ru

External links

1963 births
Living people
Footballers from Rio de Janeiro (city)
Brazilian footballers
Brazilian expatriate footballers
Olympic footballers of Brazil
Footballers at the 1984 Summer Olympics
Olympic silver medalists for Brazil
Olympic medalists in football
J1 League players
Tokyo Verdy players
Expatriate footballers in Japan
Association football defenders
Medalists at the 1984 Summer Olympics